The  Miss Arkansas Teen USA competition is the pageant that selects the representative for the state of Arkansas in the Miss Teen USA pageant.

The state pageant was directed by Premier Pageants from 2002 to 2007 before becoming part of the Vanbros organization, headquartered in Lenexa, Kansas. In 2007, Vanbros group took over the management of the pageant with the Kansas, Nebraska, Missouri and Oklahoma pageants.

From 1986 until 2004, when Sarah French won Miss Photogenic, no Miss Arkansas Teen USA had placed or won an award at the national competition. From 2008 until 2010, Arkansas had placed at Miss Teen USA three consecutive years, including Stevi Perry winning their first Miss Teen USA title in 2008.

Three Miss Arkansas Teen USA titleholders have gone on to win the Miss Arkansas USA title and three have won Miss America state titles, more than any other state.

Allie Shanks of White River was crowned Miss Arkansas Teen USA 2022 on April 10, 2022 at The Fort Smith Convention Center in Fort Smith. She will represent Arkansas for the title of Miss Teen USA 2022.

Results summary

Placements
Winner: Stevi Perry (2008)
Top 10: Angela Boyd (1983), Rhonda Heird (1985)
Top 15/16: Allison Kusenberger (2009), Megan Burgess (2010), Abby Floyd (2013), Arynn Johnson (2015), Maggie Williams (2019), Anna Claire Hay (2020)
Arkansas holds a record of 9 placements at Miss Teen USA.

Awards
Miss Congeniality: Angela Boyd (1983), Dana Mooney (1986)
Miss Photogenic: Sarah French (2004)

Winners 

1 Age at the time of the Miss Teen USA pageant

References

External links
Official website

Arkansas
Women in Arkansas